St. Columba's School in Delhi, India, was established in 1941 by the Indian Province of the Congregation of Christian Brothers, which was founded by Edmund Ignatius Rice. The school's campus is located in the heart of Delhi and extends over 7 acres. St. Columba's School alumni include three Rhodes Scholars, a Pulitzer Prize winner, and a Forbes 30 Under 30 awardee. Students are referred to as Columbans. The school admits only boys.

History
St. Columba's was founded in 1941 by the Congregation of Christian Brothers. St. Columba's School, New Delhi is one of the 19 Christian Brothers Schools in India. St. Columba's School began with 32 boys in New Delhi next to the Sacred Heart Cathedral, admitting through class 6. It was one of the first schools in India to introduce computer education. The junior school opened in 1942, at the site of what previously had been a rose garden.

Notable alumni

Academics and Sciences

 Deepak Chopra, 1963, physician, public speaker, writer and New Age spiritual guru
 Sanjiv Chopra, 1964, physician, Professor of Medicine and former Faculty Dean for Continuing Medical Education at Harvard Medical School
 Rajeev Motwani, Gödel Prize winner, former Professor of Computer Science at Stanford University
 Randeep Guleria, 1975, surgeon, Padma Shri awardee
 Siddhartha Mukherjee, Rhodes Scholar, Padma Shri, Pulitzer Prize winning author of The Emperor of All Maladies: A Biography of Cancer; Assistant Professor of Medicine at Columbia University
 Nitin Nohria, 1980, 10th and current dean of Harvard Business School, where he was named the Richard P. Chapman Professor of Business Administration
 Pradipta Banerji, Professor and Director IIT Roorkee
 Mahesh Rangarajan, Rhodes Scholar and Professor of History at Krea University
 Suhas Pandurang Sukhatme, 1952, Padma Shri, Director of IIT Bombay, Chairman of Atomic Energy Regulatory Board
 C V Seshadri, Professor and Dean IIT Kanpur
 Pradeep Dubey, game theorist, Professor of Economics at SUNY, Stony Brook
 Vijay Balasubramanian, theoretical physicist, Professor of Physics and Neuroscience at the University of Pennsylvania
 Prashant Pillai, Professor of Cyber Security and Associate Dean for Research and Knowledge Enterprise at University of Wolverhampton

Arts and Entertainment

 Shah Rukh Khan, 1985, Padma Shri, Ordre des Arts et des Lettres, Legion d'honneur, Indian actor
 Ritvik Arora, 2015, actor
 George Chakravarthi, artist
 Mukul Dev, actor 
 Rahul Dev, model and actor
 Vinil Mathew, ad-filmmaker and Bollywood director
 Gaurav Chopra, actor
 Arjun Mathur, actor 
 Kunal Nayyar, actor; best known for his role as Raj Koothrappali on the American sitcom The Big Bang Theory
 Sanam Puri, Bollywood singer and independent artist
 Cyrus Sahukar, 1998, VJ and actor 
 Palash Sen, singer (Euphoria) 
 Sudeep Sen, author/poet 
 Keith Sequeira, actor and model
 Samir Kochhar, actor and television presenter known for being the host of the Indian Premier League 
 Anubhav Srivastava, 2004, filmmaker
 Amit Khanna, film executive, filmmaker, lyricist, winner of National Film Award for Best Lyrics in 1995
 Vibhav Roy, actor, model
 Tarun Jain, writer, actor
 Ali Kazimi, filmmaker and writer
 Amit Khanna Writer, Poet, Film maker, Entrepreneur, Media Guru.

Politics
 Rahul Gandhi, politician, son of former Prime Minister Rajiv Gandhi; Former President of the Indian National Congress and Chairperson of the United Progressive Alliance Sonia Gandhi
 Sanjay Gandhi, Indian National Congress politician; son of Prime Minister Indira Gandhi
 Gaurav Gogoi, Member of Parliament
 Derek O'Brien, Indian television personality and Member of Parliament
 Anil Shastri, politician, former member of Lok Sabha representing the Indian National Congress. 
 Jayant Sinha, Minister of State, Finance, Government of India; Member of Parliament
 Abhishek Manu Singhvi, 1975, politician, spokesperson for the Indian National Congress
 Adarsh Shastri, politician belonging to the Aam Aadmi Party
 Suneet Chopra, politician, trade unionist, belonging to the Communist Party of India (Marxist)
 Conrad Sangma, Chief Minister of the State of Meghalaya
 Sidharth Nath Singh, Minister of Health, Government of Uttar Pradesh

Civil Servants
 Ajit Seth, 30th Cabinet Secretary of India
 Najeeb Jung, Lieutenant Governor of Delhi, ex-vice chancellor of Jamia Millia Islamia
 Vijay Keshav Gokhale, 32nd Foreign Secretary of India
 Rahul Bhatnagar, Chief Secretary of Uttar Pradesh
 Gopalaswami Parthasarathy, Indian High Commissioner to Pakistan during the Kargil War
 Deepak Vohra, India's Ambassador to Armenia
 Manjeev Singh Puri, India's Ambassador to Brussels and Nepal

Law
 Badar Durrez Ahmed, Chief Justice High Court of Jammu and Kashmir
 Justice Dhananjaya Y. Chandrachud, Chief Justice of India
 Justice B. P. Singh, Justice of Supreme Court of India

Business
 Ivan Menezes, 1975, CEO of Diageo
 Suresh Kumar, Director-General U.S. Foreign Commercial Service
 Romesh Wadhwani, 1962, Padma Shri, Founder of Symphony Technology Group
 Sanjeev Bikhchandani, 1981, Padma Shri, Founder and CEO of Naukri.com
 Piyush Gupta, 1976, CEO and Director of DBS Bank
 Ajay Singh, 1984, founder and Chairman, SpiceJet
 Asim Ghosh, 1963, former CEO of Husky Energy, an integrated Canadian oil and gas company and former CEO of Vodafone Essar.
 Victor Menezes, Senior Vice Chairman, Citigroup
 Lalit Modi, businessman, cricket administrator
 Lalit Suri, hotelier and Rajya Sabha Member of Parliament
 Neeraj Kanwar, Vice Chairman and Managing Director of Apollo Tyres
 Patu Keswani, Chairman and Managing Director of Lemon Tree Hotels
 Yashish Dahiya, Founder and CEO of Policybazaar
 Sumant Sinha, Chairman and Managing Director of ReNew Power
 Deep Kalra, 1987, Founder and CEO of MakeMyTrip
 Sandeep Jajodia, Chairman and Managing Director of Monnet Ispat and Energy
 Vivek Paul, former Vice Chairman and CEO, Wipro
 Rajeev Kakar, 1980, Executive Vice President, Fullerton Financial Holdings
 Sandeep P Parekh, financial lawyer, former Executive Director of SEBI, WEF Young Global Leader

Military
 Rana Chhina, IAF, recipient of the MacGregor Medal and military historian
 Maj Bhaskar Roy, 20th Lancers, recipient of the Maha Vir Chakra  
 Lt Arun Khetarpal, Poona Horse, recipient of the Param Vir Chakra
 Lt Gen DS Hooda, former Northern Army commander, and principal architect of the 2016 Indian Line of Control strike

Sports
 Ashish Bagai, former captain, and keeper-batsman of the Canadian cricket team
 Arun Lal, cricketer and commentator
 Mansher Singh, 1985, sport shooter, Olympic athlete
 Novy Kapadia, Indian football journalist, critic and commentator often considered to be India's foremost football expert and commentator
 Brigadier Amreshwar Pratap Singh, 1967, yachtsman, member of First Indian circumnavigation team 1985-1987 on Trishna (yacht)

See also
 List of Christian Brothers schools in India
 List of Christian Schools in India

References

Congregation of Christian Brothers schools in India
Catholic secondary schools in India
Boys' schools in India
Schools in Colonial India
Christian schools in Delhi
Educational institutions established in 1941
1941 establishments in India